was a cargo steamship that was built in Scotland in 1890, was in German ownership until 1913, and then had a succession of Japanese owners until she was wrecked in 1926. She was launched as Stubbenhuk, renamed Sicilia in 1894, Komagata Maru in 1913 and Heian Maru in 1924.

In 1914 Komagata Maru was chartered to take 376 Sikh and other migrants from the Far East to Canada, where they wished to settle. This resulted in the Komagata Maru incident, in which Canadian immigration authorities in Vancouver, British Columbia refused to let most of them disembark.

Building and German ownership
In 1890 Charles Connell and Company of Scotstoun, Glasgow built a pair of cargo steamships for Dampfschiffs Rhederei "Hansa". Yard number 167 was launched on 20 May as Grimm, and yard number 168 was launched on 13 August as Stubbenhuk. She was completed that September.

She was mainly a cargo ship, but had berths for a small number of passengers.

Dampfschiffs Rhederei "Hansa" registered Stubbenhuk at Hamburg. The company ran mainly cargo services between Hamburg, Canada and the United States. On 19 October 1890 Stubbenhuk left Hamburg on her maiden voyage, which was to Quebec and Montreal.

In 1892 Hamburg America Line (HAPAG) took over Dampfschiffs Rhederei "Hansa". By April 1892 Stubbenhuks route included calls at Antwerp, and in December 1893 she called at Baltimore. By 1893 her German code letters were RJCS. In 1894 HAPAG absorbed the Hansa fleet into its own and renamed its ships. Grimm and Stubbenhuk became Scotia and Sicilia respectively.

Japanese ownership

In 1913 Shinyei Kisen Goshi Kaisha bought Sicilia, renamed her Komagata Maru, and registered her in Dairen in the Japanese-ruled Kwantung Leased Territory. Shinyei Kisen Goshi owned one other ship, and four or five people owned the company.

It was from Shinyei Kisen that Sikh migrants chartered her in 1914 to take them across the Pacific to British Columbia. Her holds were cleaned and fitted out with latrines, wooden benches, a meeting room and a Sikh Gurdwara. On 4 April 1914 she left Hong Kong carrying 150 migrants. She embarked further Indian migrants at Shanghai, Moji and Yokohama. On 23 May she reached Vancouver carrying 376 migrants, only 24 of whom were allowed to disembark. She lay at anchor in Vancouver Harbour until 23 July, when she left taking her remaining migrants back to Japan and India.

By 1917 Komagata Marus Japanese code letters were QBHP. Her Japanese official number was 25107. In 1917 Kawauchi Goshi Kaisha acquired her, and by 1919 she was equipped for wireless telegraphy. In 1921 Yamashita Kisen KK acquired her and registered her in Fusan in Japanese-ruled Korea. In 1923 Kabafuto Kisen KK acquired her and registered her in Nishinomiya. In 1924 Kasahara Shoji KK acquired her, renamed her Heian Maru and registered her in Osaka.

Loss
On 11 February 1926 Heian Maru was steaming around the coast of Hokkaido from Otaru to Muroran when she was wrecked near .

Notes

References

Bibliography

1890 ships
Maritime incidents in April 1914
Maritime incidents in 1926
Merchant ships of the German Empire
Merchant ships of Japan
Ships built on the River Clyde
Ships of the Hamburg America Line
Steamships of the German Empire
Steamships of Japan